Metacyclops postojnae is a species of copepod in the family Cyclopidae.

The IUCN conservation status of Metacyclops postojnae is "VU", vulnerable. The species faces a high risk of endangerment in the medium term. The IUCN status was reviewed in 1996.

References

Cyclopidae
Articles created by Qbugbot
Crustaceans described in 1987